Gilberto Gierbolini-Ortiz (December 22, 1926 – December 29, 2009) was a United States district judge of the United States District Court for the District of Puerto Rico.

Education and career

Born in Coamo, Puerto Rico, Gierbolini-Ortiz was a sergeant in the United States Army during World War II, from 1943 to 1946, and was later a captain in the Army from 1951 to 1957, and served in Korea. He received a Bachelor of Arts degree from the University of Puerto Rico in 1957 and a Bachelor of Laws from the University of Puerto Rico School of Law in 1961. He was an Assistant United States Attorney for the Commonwealth of Puerto Rico from 1961 to 1966, and was then a judge on the Superior Court for the Commonwealth of Puerto Rico from 1966 to 1969. He was an assistant secretary of justice and commonwealth solicitor general of Puerto Rico from 1969 to 1972, also serving as an assistant commonwealth attorney general for antitrust 1970 to 1972. In 1972, he was Chairman of the State Elections Board for the Commonwealth of Puerto Rico. He was in private practice in Puerto Rico from 1973 to 1980.

Federal judicial service

On November 30, 1979, Gierbolini-Ortiz was nominated by President Jimmy Carter to a new seat on the United States District Court for the District of Puerto Rico created by 92 Stat. 1629. He was confirmed by the United States Senate on February 20, 1980, and received his commission the same day. He served as Chief Judge from 1991 to 1993, assuming senior status on December 27, 1993. Gierbolini-Ortiz served in that capacity until his retirement, on March 23, 2004.

Death

Gierbolini-Ortiz died on December 29, 2009, at the age of 83. He was interred at the Puerto Rico National Cemetery in Bayamón, Puerto Rico.

See also
List of Hispanic/Latino American jurists

References

Sources
 
 

1926 births
2009 deaths
20th-century American judges
United States Army personnel of the Korean War
Assistant United States Attorneys
Hispanic and Latino American judges
Judges of the United States District Court for the District of Puerto Rico
United States district court judges appointed by Jimmy Carter
United States Army officers
People from Coamo, Puerto Rico
University of Puerto Rico alumni